Symplocos myrtacea, commonly known as Japanese sapphireberry or in Japanese hai-no-ki ハイノキ, is a tree native to Japan.

It has been recorded as a host for the rare fungus Chorioactis geaster.

References

myrtacea
Flora of Japan